Jeon Da-hye (born November 23, 1983 in Pohang, Gyeongsangbuk-do) is a South Korean short track speed skater who won gold in the women's 3000 metre relay at the 2006 Winter Olympics.

In 1999 Jeon earned her first call to the South Korea women's national short track team at the age of 16. In 2001, she won two silver medals at the World Championships as a member of the national team.

In 2001 Jeon was omitted from the national team roster and did not participated in the 2002 Winter Olympics. In February 2002, however, Jeon gained attention again, winning five gold medals at the national collegiate championships.

Jeon first participated at the Winter Olympics in February 2006. She was expected to compete in the 500 metres as well but competed only in the 3000 metre relay due to injuries, combining with Choi Eun-Kyung, Byun Chun-Sa, Jin Sun-Yu and Kang Yun-Mi. Team Korea eventually won its fourth consecutive Olympic women's 3000 metre relay gold medal.

Jeon was selected as the reserve member of the South Korean national team for the 2010 Winter Olympics, ranked sixth overall in the national Olympic trials. However, she did not get a chance to participate in any event at the Olympics. In February 2011, Jeon won the gold medal in the women's senior 500 metres at the 2011 Korean National Sports Festival by .37 of a second to beat out 2006 Olympic gold medalist Kang Yun-Mi.

References

External links
 
 databasesports profile

1983 births
Living people
South Korean female short track speed skaters
Olympic short track speed skaters of South Korea
Olympic gold medalists for South Korea
Olympic medalists in short track speed skating
Short track speed skaters at the 2006 Winter Olympics
Medalists at the 2006 Winter Olympics
Universiade gold medalists for South Korea
Universiade bronze medalists for South Korea
Universiade medalists in short track speed skating
Medalists at the 2003 Winter Universiade
Competitors at the 2005 Winter Universiade
People from Pohang
Sportspeople from North Gyeongsang Province
21st-century South Korean women